Yutanovka is a rural locality (a selo) and the administrative center of Yutanovskoye Rural Settlement, Volokonovsky District, Belgorod Oblast, Russia. The population was 870 as of 2010. There are 13 streets.

Geography 
Yutanovka is located 8 km west of Volokonovka (the district's administrative centre) by road. Volokonovka is the nearest rural locality.

References 

Rural localities in Volokonovsky District